Words taken down is a parliamentary procedure in the United States House of Representatives by which one member requests that another member be sanctioned for remarks that violate decorum. Such remarks can include profanity, personal aspersions against a House member, or references to decisions in the Senate.

The Congressional Research Service summarized the process in the following way:

Martin L. Levine, law professor at the University of Southern California, notes that "Taking down words, like 'taking down names,' is the start and not the end of a process. A separate step is required to rule the words out of order."

A 1999 study by Kathleen Hall Jamieson found that requests to take down words peaked in 1946 and 1995, years before or after control of the House changed hands.

References

United States House of Representatives